"Last Dance" is a song by South Korean girl group (G)I-dle produced by GroovyRoom and written by Kriz and Soyeon, released on April 29, 2021, as the fourth promotional single through Universe, a global fandom platform created by international video game developer, NCSoft that allows users to enjoy various fandom activities and provide never-before-seen content anytime on mobile. The song is a deep house pop genre that stands out with the sophisticated unique sound of GroovyRoom.

Background
In November 2020, NCSoft and its subsidiary Klap announced that they will release the K-pop entertainment app Universe, an all-in-one platform that allows global fans to enjoy various online and offline fandom activities on mobile, combining the latest IT technologies such as Artificial Intelligence (AI). On November 16, (G)I-dle was the fifth artist to join the platform. The app was launched on January 28, 2021.

On April 19, 2021, Universe announced that they have decided to release "Last Dance (Prod. GroovyRoom)" without Soojin following her, at the time, temporary hiatus from the group which was announced in early March.

The statement concluded that the song's composition and lyrics have been modified. Pictorial, making-of video and music video was also re-edited and will centre around the remaining members. The song has since become their first release as a quintet following the announcement of Soojin's permanent departure from the group on August 14, however, she can be seen in the music video.

(G)I-dle became the fourth act to participate in the Universe Music series after Iz*One, Sumi Jo and Rain, and Park Ji-hoon.

Music and lyrics
"Last Dance" is a deep house pop song that provides fun listening with chic and powerful vocals and rap. The song was produced by hip-hop producer GroovyRoom and written by the leader of (G)I-dle, Soyeon and multi-talented female singer-songwriter Kriz with lyrics suitable for the song concept of dark witch. The song has the beats per minute of 116, is in the key D major and has a duration of 3:04.

Promotion
On April 20, Universe released the cover image of the song. The same day, a promotional schedule for it was posted on the Universe's social media accounts. Concept photos for the song were released on April 21 and 22. In the pictures, the five members wore unique crowns which exude dark charisma yet dreamy charms. The next day, a prologue film entitled The Witch Queen was released and it features the group members who have transformed into witches wandering the cursed forest in the dark to seek out the hidden queen. At the end of the video, the witches face a deer that glows brightly, and the fairy tale video ends.

Credits and personnel
Credits are adapted from Tidal.

Song credits
 (G)I-dle – vocals	
 Soyeon – producing, songwriting, rap arrangement
 GroovyRoom – producing, record engineering, instruments 	
 Kriz – songwriting

Visual credits
 Illumin – music video director

Music video
Prior to its release, the song was accompanied by two music video teasers released on April 26 and 27, respectively. The first teaser presents a reversal charm with a black and white concept. (G)I-dle exudes mystical charm with a noble, pure white dress while showing dark charisma with intense black costumes in a fantastical forest brimming with what seems to be a swarm of fireflies. At the end of the video, the members are seen gazing at a mysterious sparkling sphere. The second teaser features the group performing the sword dance and at the end of the video, a short passage with a highlight along with the signature sound of GroovyRoom. The official music video was released on the Universe app on April 29 and a preview of the video was released on YouTube the same day. Directed by Illumin, it features the group wandering through a dense forest in the middle of the night while following a mysterious compass. The music video also features scenes of the individual members in a dimly lit laboratory filled with strange experiments. The video was (G)I-dle’s last music video as a sextet, before Soojin’s departure from the group in August 2021.

Accolades

Charts

Release history

References

External links
 
 

(G)I-dle songs
2021 singles
2021 songs
Warner Music Group singles
Songs written by Jeon So-yeon